Vasco Fernandes Coutinho (1490–1561) was a Portuguese fidalgo and the first donatary of the Captaincy of Espírito Santo, a colonial territory in what is now Brazil.

Biography
Vasco Fernandes Coutinho was born in Portugal. He was later amongst the first 12 volunteers from Portugal to come to the newly discovered land of Brazil. He was presented the area which became Espírito Santo and administered the colony for 25 years, despite being a military man by trade.

He founded both the first capital of Espírito Santo (today known as Vila Velha, "Old Town") and the current capital Vitória.

During his administration Espírito Santo's first two churches – São João and Rosário, both in Vila Velha – were founded in 1551. Both are still standing.

External links
O Estado do Espirito Santo – Brasil (port)

|-

Espírito Santo
1490 births
1561 deaths
Portuguese colonial governors and administrators
Colonial Brazil
Portuguese colonization of the Americas
Brazilian city founders
16th-century Portuguese people
People from Serpa
Fernandes Coutinho
Portuguese city founders